Vojtech Stantien (born 15 January 1939) is a Slovak boxer. He competed in the men's light middleweight event at the 1968 Summer Olympics.

References

1939 births
Living people
Slovak male boxers
Czechoslovak male boxers
Olympic boxers of Czechoslovakia
Boxers at the 1968 Summer Olympics
Sportspeople from Košice
Light-middleweight boxers